Sävsjö Municipality (Sävsjö kommun) is a municipality in Jönköping County, southern Sweden where the town Sävsjö is seat.

The municipality was created  by the local government reform of 1971, when the City of Sävsjö (instituted as late as 1947) was amalgamated with parts of two adjacent rural municipalities. Two years later it was completed when Hjälmseryd was added.

Geography
The municipality is located on the South Swedish highlands and comprise the old Västra Härad.  It is considered a scenic place because the forests are not as dense as in the rest of Småland and the terrain is more varied.

Localities
There are four urban areas (also called a Tätort or locality) in Sävsjö Municipality.

In the table the localities are listed according to the size of the population as of December 31, 2005. The municipal seat is in bold characters.

History
The area has been inhabited since early Stone Age. Both archeological finds and the five medieval churches from the 12th century stands as reminiscence from those days. A  few kilometers from where the town Sävsjö is located today, was for instance the centre of the old administrative court house called  Västra Härad Court.

Today

Sävsjö Municipality is working hard to increase its population. It currently has a half-price offer when buying plots of land with the intention of building a house here.

Politically Sävsjö Municipality is a stronghold of the Kristdemokraterna, the Christian Democrats (12 mandates of 39). The party is the largest in the municipal assembly (kommunfullmäktige).

In contemporary Sweden today, Sävsjö Municipality is perhaps most known for the successful handball team Sävsjö HK.

References
Statistics Sweden

External links

Sävsjö Municipality - Official site
Sävsjö Trähus - Sävsjö Wooden House (company). In Swedish, English, German and Finnish.

Municipalities of Jönköping County